"Reply" is a song by American rapper A Boogie wit da Hoodie featuring fellow American rapper Lil Uzi Vert. It was released on November 15, 2019, by Highbridge and Atlantic Records as the second single from the former's third studio album Artist 2.0 (2020). Written alongside producers Go Grizzly and JoeFromYO, the music video for the song was released on June 18, 2020.

Composition and critical reception 
In the song, A Boogie and Lil Uzi ask women if they would reply to them on their phones when they write to them. Reflecting on their relationships with women, they bemoan over their love interests not returning their affection. Trey Alston of MTV called the song "beautiful with a chill melody and a relaxing groove."

Charts

Certifications

References

2019 singles
2019 songs
A Boogie wit da Hoodie songs
Lil Uzi Vert songs
Atlantic Records singles
Songs written by A Boogie wit da Hoodie
Songs written by Lil Uzi Vert